A Lommel polynomial Rm,ν(z), introduced by , is a polynomial in 1/z giving the recurrence relation 

where Jν(z) is a Bessel function of the first kind.

They are given explicitly by

See also
Lommel function
Neumann polynomial

References

Polynomials
Special functions